Heonan of Silla (died 861) (r. 857–861) was the 47th king of the Silla kingdom of Korea.  He was the younger half-brother of King Sinmu.   What little we know of his reign comes from the Samguk Sagi.

Following a famine in the year 859, he sent relief to the peasants and supported agriculture through the construction of irrigation works.

Being without a son, Heonan chose his relative Kim Eung-ryeom as his heir.  After his death, Kim Eung-ryeom took the throne, becoming King Gyeongmun.  His tomb in Gyeongju was known as the Gongjakji (공작지/孔雀趾).

Family 
Parents
 Father: Prince Kim Gyun-jung (김균정), posthumously named King Chujong (추존 국왕)
Grandfather: Prince Ye–yeong (예영)
 Mother: Madame Jomyeong ( 조명부인)
Consort and their respective issue:
 Unknown Wife:
 Daughter: Queen Munui of the Kim clan (문의왕후 김씨)–married Gyeongmun of Silla
Daughter: Secondary Consort Kim (차비 김씨)–married Gyeongmun of Silla
 Son (presumed): Gungye (궁예) (it is unclear whether his father was King Heonan or King Gyeongmun)

See also
List of Korean monarchs
Unified Silla
History of Korea

References

Silla rulers
861 deaths
9th-century Korean monarchs
Year of birth unknown